Beyt-e Fariyeh (also Romanized as Beyt-e Farīyeḥ) is a village in Tarrah Rural District, Hamidiyeh District, Ahvaz County, Khuzestan Province, Iran. At the 2006 census, its population was 21, in 5 families.

References 

Populated places in Ahvaz County